"The Loco-Motion" is a 1962 pop song written by American songwriters Gerry Goffin and Carole King. "The Loco-Motion" was originally written for R&B singer Dee Dee Sharp, but Sharp turned the song down. 

The song is notable for appearing in the American Top 3 thrice, each time in a different decade: in 1962 by Little Eva (U.S. No. 1); in 1974 by Grand Funk Railroad (also U.S. No. 1); and in 1988 by Kylie Minogue (U.S. No. 3).

The song is an enduring example of the dance-song genre; much of the lyric is devoted to a description of the dance itself, usually performed as a type of line dance. However, the song pre-dates the dance.

"The Loco-Motion" was also the second song to reach No. 1 by two different musical acts in America. The earlier song to do this was "Go Away Little Girl", also written by Goffin and King. It is one of only nine songs to achieve this feat.

Little Eva version

Background
King and Goffin wrote "The Loco-Motion" in hopes to have it recorded by Dee Dee Sharp, who had a hit with "Mashed Potato Time". Sharp passed on the song, leaving the opportunity open for Eva Boyd, who had recorded the demo. Boyd's version was released, and her name was changed to Little Eva. Boyd was Carole King's babysitter, having been introduced to King and King's husband Gerry Goffin by The Cookies, a local girl group who would also record for the songwriters.

"The Loco-Motion" was the first release by the new Dimension Records company, whose releases were mostly penned and produced by Goffin and King. There are two common versions of the song in circulation: one includes handclaps during the verses; the other has no handclaps. King performed the backup vocals in the recording.

Reception
In the United States, "The Loco-Motion" was the seventh most successful single of 1962, according to Billboard. It was also the third most successful single of 1962 in South Africa.

In March 1965, Little Eva sang the song on the ABC-TV series Shindig!, and this is the only known video of her singing this song. A cover version of the song was recorded quickly by British girl group The Vernons Girls and scored the chart the same week as the Little Eva version. The Vernons Girls' version stalled at No. 47 in the UK, while the Little Eva version reached No. 2 on the UK charts. It re-entered the chart some 10 years later and almost became a top 10 again, peaking at No. 11. The Little Eva version of the song was later featured in the David Lynch film Inland Empire (2006). "The Loco-Motion" is ranked No. 359 on Rolling Stones list of "The 500 Greatest Songs of All Time".

"The Loco-Motion" myth
The widely believed story of how the song "The Loco-Motion" came to be is that Carole King was playing music at home and Eva Boyd was doing some chores and started dancing to it; the dance The Loco-Motion was born. However, this is not true. Eva Boyd was introduced to Goffin and King and they realized she had a good singing voice, so they had her record "The Loco-Motion". King stated this during an interview on National Public Radio (NPR) shortly after Little Eva died.

As the song came before the dance, there was no dance when the song was originally written. When the song became a smash hit, Eva Boyd ended up having to create a dance to go along with the song. King stated this in her "One to One" concert video. In live performances of the song, Little Eva can be seen doing her version of the dance.

Another bit of the conventional lore is that she had received only $50 for "The Loco-Motion". However, although she never owned the rights to her recordings, it seems $50 was actually her weekly salary during the years she was making records (an increase of $15 from what Goffin and King had been paying her as nanny). In 1971, she moved to North Carolina and lived in obscurity on menial jobs and welfare until being rediscovered in 1987. She died of cervical cancer in 2003.

Top-40 DJ Dan Ingram has been quoted as saying that he believes the original "The Loco-Motion" was recorded by King herself. Producer Pete Waterman has also stated he believes it is King singing on the recording.

Chart performance

Weekly charts

Year-end charts

Sylvie Vartan version (in French)

In 1962, the French singer Sylvie Vartan recorded a cover of "The Loco-Motion" in French, called "Le Loco-motion". Vartan's version went to number 1 in France on October 13, 1962, and remained there for one week.

Track listing
7-inch EP: "Le Loco-motion" / "Aussi loin que j'irai" / "Oui c'est lui" / "Comme l'été dernier" RCA Victor 76.593, 86.593 (1962, France)
A1. "Le Loco-motion" ("The Loco-Motion")
A2. "Oui c'est lui" ("He Is the Boy")
B1. "Comme l'été dernier" ("Dancing Party")
B2. "Aussi loin que j'irai"

Charts

Grand Funk Railroad version

Background
American rock band Grand Funk Railroad recorded a cover version of the song in 1974, produced by Todd Rundgren. The decision to play the song came about after guitarist Mark Farner was heard whistling the song in the studio. The Grand Funk version of the song featured guitars, several layers of harmony, and heavy drums. 

During the 2000s, this version of the song was featured in advertisements for the Japanese technology and communications company SoftBank, featuring the pop group SMAP. SMAP also used the song on their television variety show SMAP×SMAP for a music video, singing along to the original Grand Funk recording rather than covering it.

The song is available as downloadable content for Rock Band 3.

Reception
"The Loco-Motion" appeared on Grand Funk Railroad's album Shinin' On and was released as a single in February 1974, eventually peaking at No. 1 on the U.S. Billboard Hot 100 chart for two weeks in May 1974. It also reached number 5 in Australia, peaked at number 1 in Canada, and reached number 11 in Germany.

In the 2004 edition of The Rolling Stone Album Guide, Village Voice Media music critic Nick Catucci called the cover "embarrassing".

Chart performance

Weekly charts

Year-end charts

Ritz version
Disco group Ritz covered this song in 1979. Their version peaked at number one in New Zealand for seven non-consecutive weeks in 1980, becoming the most successful record of the year there. The Ritz version was also a top-20 hit in Australia, Sweden, and Switzerland. The live arrangement that Kylie Minogue performed on her Golden Tour and Summer 2019 Tour is based upon this recording.

Charts

Weekly charts

Year-end charts

Carole King version
Carole King also recorded a version of "The Loco-Motion" for her 1980 studio album Pearls: Songs of Goffin and King. The album peaked at No. 44 and spawned King's last top 40 hit to-date, "One Fine Day", which would reach No. 12 on the charts. King also sings the "Loco-Motion" on her live album The Living Room Tour, released July 12, 2005.  The album peaked at No. 17 on the US album chart on July 30, 2005.

Dave Stewart and Barbara Gaskin version
In May 1986, Dave Stewart and Barbara Gaskin released a cover version of the song as a single. The duo had scored a UK No. 1 hit back in 1981 with their cover of "It's My Party" but had achieved little success since. For this 1986 single, they embarked on a big promotional push in an attempt to gain a second significant hit. The single, however, stalled at No. 70 in the UK charts in June.

Kylie Minogue version

Background
Australian pop singer Kylie Minogue released a cover version of the song in July 1987 as her debut single, under the title "Locomotion". After an impromptu performance of the song at an Australian rules football charity event with the cast of the Australian soap opera Neighbours, Minogue signed a record deal with Mushroom Records to release the song as a single. Initially recorded in a big band style, the project was radically reoriented by producer Mike Duffy, who was on loan to Mushroom from Pete Waterman's UK company PWL. Duffy recorded a whole new backing track, inspired by the hi-NRG pop of Dead or Alive, but retained Minogue's original vocal.

This version was released on July 13, 1987, in Australia, where it became one of the biggest selling Australian records of the 1980s. It was later released the same year in New Zealand, Italy, and Sweden.

The success of the song in her home country resulted in Minogue's signing a record deal with PWL Records in London and to working with the successful team Stock Aitken & Waterman (SAW). The producers decided to totally re-record Minogue's version of the song, with Pete Waterman slating her original Australian recording, which he claimed was poorly produced. Original producer Mike Duffy instead blamed the decision to re-record on Waterman's alleged wish to claim the prestige and royalties that looked set to roll in from the track's looming placement of the soundtrack of the 1988 film Arthur 2: On the Rocks, starring Dudley Moore and Liza Minnelli.

On July 28, 1988, the re-recorded version produced by SAW was released worldwide with the title "The Loco-Motion". This release, also a major success, reached the top five in Canada, the United Kingdom, and the United States. This version of the track substitutes the Australian term railway for the American term railroad in the song's lyrics.

Reception
The 1987 "Locomotion" release was a huge hit in Minogue's native Australia, reaching number one on the Kent Music Report singles chart and remaining there for seven weeks.

The 1988 release of the song in the United Kingdom debuted at number two on the singles chart—the highest entry on the UK singles charts by a female artist. It remained in the number two position for four weeks before falling to number three. With sales of 440,000 it was the eleventh best selling single of the year. The song became Minogue's third top five single in the UK and remains one of her most successful single releases to date. Throughout Europe and Asia the song also performed well on the music charts, reaching number one in Belgium, Finland, Ireland, Israel, Japan, and South Africa.

During late 1988, Minogue traveled to the United States to promote "The Loco-Motion", where she did many interviews and performances on American television. The song was used in the comedy film Arthur 2: On the Rocks. "The Loco-Motion" debuted at number 80 on the U.S. Billboard Hot 100 and later peaked at number three for two weeks. The song was Minogue's second single to chart in the U.S., but her first to reach the top ten. To this day, the song remains as her highest-charting single in the United States; however,  her second overall and most recent song to reach the top ten, 2002's "Can't Get You Out of My Head", ended up outselling "The Loco-Motion". In Canada, the song also reached the top spot in the pop sales chart.

In 2012, during her K25 anniversary, the song re-entered the Japanese Singles Chart at number 83.

Music video
The music video for "Locomotion" was directed by Chris Langman and filmed at Essendon Airport and the ABC studios in Melbourne, Australia. Choreographer Tania Lacy conceived the video's dance sequences around locomotive movements. For the international release of "The Loco-Motion", footage from the Australian music video was re-edited twice; one version for the US market and another for the European market.

Near the end of 1988, the song was nominated for 'Best International Single' at the Canadian Music Industry Awards.

Formats and track listings
These are the formats and track listings of major single releases of "The Loco-motion".

"The Loco-motion" (1988)
 UK 7-inch vinyl single
 "The Loco-motion" (7-inch mix) – 3:13
 "I'll Still Be Loving You" – 3:45

 UK 12-inch vinyl single
 "The Loco-motion" (Kohaku Mix) – 5:59
 "I'll Still Be Loving You" – 3:45

 UK 12-inch remix
 "The Loco-motion" (Sankie Mix) – 6:35
 "I'll Still Be Loving You" – 3:45

 US 7-inch vinyl single/cassingle
 "The Loco-motion" (LP version) – 3:13
 "I'll Still Be Loving You" – 3:45

 US 12-inch vinyl single
 "The Loco-motion" (Kohaku Mix) – 5:59
 "The Loco-motion" (Sankie Mix) – 6:35
 "The Loco-motion" (LP version) – 3:13
 "I'll Still Be Loving You" – 3:45

 German CD single
 "The Loco-motion" (Kohaku Mix) – 5:59
 "I'll Still Be Loving You" – 3:45

iTunes digital release (2009)
 "Locomotion" (Australian version)
 "Locomotion"
 "Locomotion" (Chugga-Motion Mix)
 "Locomotion" (The Girl Meets Boy Mix)
 "Getting Closer"
 "Getting Closer" (UK mix) (previously unreleased)
 "Getting Closer" (UK instrumental) (previously unreleased)
 "Getting Closer" (Extended Oz Mix)
 "Getting Closer" (Extended Oz Instrumental) (previously unreleased)
 "Glad to Be Alive"

 "The Loco-Motion"
 "The Loco-Motion" (7-inch mix)
 "The Loco-Motion" (The Kohaku Mix)
 "The Loco-Motion" (7-inch instrumental) (previously unreleased)
 "The Loco-Motion" (7-inch backing track) (previously unreleased)
 "I'll Still Be Loving You"
 "I'll Still Be Loving You" (instrumental) (previously unreleased)
 "I'll Still Be Loving You" (backing track) (previously unreleased)

 "The Loco-Motion" (Remix)
 "The Loco-Motion" (The Sankie Mix)
 "The Loco-Motion" (Alternative Sankie Mix)
 "The Loco-Motion" (12-inch Master)
 "The Loco-Motion" (Album Instrumental) (previously unreleased)
 "The Loco-Motion" (Album Backing Track) (previously unreleased)
 "The Loco-Motion" (Oz Tour Mix)
 "The Loco-Motion" (Oz Tour Backing Track) (previously unreleased)

Charts and sales

Weekly charts

Year-end charts

Certifications and sales

Other versions
British progressive rock group Emerson, Lake & Powell included a reworked instrumental cover of the song on their eponymous debut (and only) album in 1986.

In 1991, Joanie Bartels covered the song from the album Dancin' Magic, which was released as a single. It also appeared in the video, The Extra-Special Substitute Teacher.

In 2000, Atomic Kitten sang a cover version for Thomas and the Magic Railroad.

References

1962 songs
1962 debut singles
1974 singles
1987 debut singles
1988 singles
ARIA Award-winning songs
Songs with lyrics by Gerry Goffin
Songs written by Carole King
Little Eva songs
Sylvie Vartan songs
Dave Stewart (keyboardist) songs
Grand Funk Railroad songs
Kylie Minogue songs
Carole King songs
La Toya Jackson songs
Shelley Fabares songs
Električni Orgazam songs
Ringo Starr songs
Alexia (Italian singer) songs
Atomic Kitten songs
Orange Range songs
Song recordings produced by Gerry Goffin
Song recordings produced by Todd Rundgren
Song recordings produced by Stock Aitken Waterman
Number-one singles in Australia
Number-one singles in Canada
Billboard Hot 100 number-one singles
Cashbox number-one singles
European Hot 100 Singles number-one singles
Number-one singles in France
Number-one singles in New Zealand
RPM Top Singles number-one singles
Number-one singles in South Africa
Dimension Records singles
Capitol Records singles
RCA Victor singles
Mushroom Records singles
Geffen Records singles
CBS Records singles
Pete Waterman Entertainment singles
Teldec singles
Songs about dancing
Novelty and fad dances